KRZN (96.3 FM, "The Zone") is a commercial radio station in Billings, Montana. KRZN airs an active rock music format. The station airs what it calls "6-packs" of rock which are commercial-free six-song blocks.

"The Zone" became Billings' first modern rock or alternative radio station. The format of music it plays has sometimes been referred to as new rock as well. Its playlist tends to be a mix of alternative acts, active rock, as well as 1980s classic rock.  It began broadcasting as "The Zone" in June 2000.  It had formerly played a country music format.

Ownership
In June 2006, KRZN was acquired by Cherry Creek Radio from Fisher Radio Regional Group as part of a 24-station deal with a total reported sale price of $33.3 million. It was later acquired by Connoisseur Media.

On May 7, 2019 Connoisseur Media announced that it would sell its Billings cluster to Desert Mountain Broadcasting, an entity formed by Connoisseur Billings general manager Cam Maxwell. The sale closed on July 31, 2019.

References

External links
The Zone 96.3 Facebook
KRZN Official Website

RZN
Active rock radio stations in the United States
Radio stations established in 1998
1998 establishments in Montana